Hey is the label debut EP by American rapper/producer Le1f, released on March 11, 2014 on the Terrible Records. The EP also marks the first official hip hop release for Terrible Records, aside from Solange's 2013 single "Looks Good with Trouble" that featured Kendrick Lamar.

Track listing

A "Wut" wasn't rerecorded, but rather cleaned up by Daniel Lynas to match the production quality throughout the record.

References

External links
Hey on Discogs
Hey on iTunes

2014 debut EPs
Terrible Records EPs